Radauli is a down in the city of Faizabad in the state of Uttar Pradesh in India.

People of Radauli used the surname Radaulvi, and those from Faizabad in general used the surname faizabadi.

Neighbourhoods in Faizabad